The 7C Survey (7C) of radio sources was performed by the Cavendish Astrophysics Group using the Cambridge Low-Frequency Synthesis Telescope at Mullard Radio Astronomy Observatory.

7